Ardisia jamaicensis is a species of plant in the family Primulaceae. It is endemic to Jamaica.

References

jamaicensis
Endemic flora of Jamaica
Taxonomy articles created by Polbot